Maitland Grossmann High School (abbreviated as MGHS) is a government-funded co-educational comprehensive secondary day school, located in East Maitland, in the Hunter region of New South Wales, Australia. The school is situated on Cumberland St, adjacent to the old Maitland Gaol. 

Established in 1884 as the girls only single-sex Maitland Girls' High School, in 1986 the school collaborated with Maitland Boys High, and now both schools are co-educational, with Maitland Girls' High School renamed as Maitland Grossmann High School, and Maitland Boys' High School renamed as Maitland High School. Maitland Grossmann High School enrolled approximately 1,200 students in 2018, from Year 7 to Year 12, of whom seven percent identified as Indigenous Australians and six percent were from a language background other than English. The school is operated by the NSW Department of Education. 

The school draws it name from Jeanette Grossman, who provided accommodation for the school in its early years.

Academic results 
Maitland Grossmann excels in many areas of study, and is one of the most successful schools in the Hunter Region. The school has a reputation in the Maitland community in the following areas: academic achievement; quality creative and performing arts; excellence in sport; caring student welfare; and highly effective behaviour management strategies.

In 2012, Maitland Grossmann High School celebrated its best NSW Higher School Certificate (HSC) results in recent years, being placed 211th in New South Wales and second in Newcastle/Central Coast for comprehensive high schools based on Band 6 results.

In 2017, Maitland Grossmann High School celebrated a student achieve first in the state for Visual Arts. This student was the first ever to come from a public, non-selective high school since the establishment of the HSC.

Sports 
The school currently holds the cross country regional combined high schools trophy. The school also contains the swimming and athletics zone trophies, and has for many years running.

See also 

 List of government schools in New South Wales
 Education in Australia

References

Further reading

External links

Public high schools in New South Wales
Educational institutions established in 1884
Maitland, New South Wales
1884 establishments in Australia